Desirae Krawczyk and Joe Salisbury defeated Giuliana Olmos and Marcelo Arévalo in the final, 7–5, 6–2 to win the mixed doubles tennis title at the 2021 US Open. By winning the title, Krawczyk and Salisbury received their third and second major mixed doubles title, respectively. Their victory together made Krawczyk the first player to win three consecutive mixed doubles major trophies since Mahesh Bhupathi in 2005 and 2006, and the seventh player in the Open Era to win three mixed doubles titles in a single season. Salisbury became the first man to win both the men's doubles and mixed doubles titles at the US Open in the same year since Bob Bryan in 2010.

Arévalo became the first player from Central America to reach a Grand Slam final.

Bethanie Mattek-Sands and Jamie Murray were the two-time defending champions, having won the most recent editions in 2018 and 2019, but lost in the first round to Andreja Klepač and Joran Vliegen.

Seeds

Draw

Finals

Top half

Bottom half

Other entry information

Wild cards

Protected ranking

Alternates

Withdrawals
  Květa Peschke /  Kevin Krawietz → replaced by  Dayana Yastremska /  Max Purcell
  Elena Rybakina /  Andrey Golubev → replaced by  Ellen Perez /  Marcelo Demoliner
  Vera Zvonareva /  Tim Pütz → replaced by  Hayley Carter /  Hunter Reese

See also 
2021 US Open – Day-by-day summaries

References

External links
Main Draw

US Open - Mixed Doubles
US Open - Mixed Doubles
Mixed Doubles
US Open (tennis) by year – Mixed doubles